Ulitsa Sezam (Russian: Улица Сезам) is the Russian production of the children's television program Sesame Street. The show was first released in 1996 and went off the air in 2010.

History
In 1993 Sesame Workshop recruited Natasha Lance Rogoff to produce Ulitsa Sezam.

The initial creation of this series proved difficult with a myriad of complications like cultural clashes with prospective native talent, many of whom were resistant to emulating the American style of puppetry created by Jim Henson. Instead, they proposed native puppetry material that the producers like Rogoff could not accept as they were too violent, frightening or going against the Children's Television Workshop's educational curriculum. There were other problems like the assassinations of some of the production's local business partners, serious financial difficulties by the production's major local producer, and a military raid on the studio in which vital materials were seized.

The series debuted on October 22, 1996, on TV channels NTV and ORT. 

In addition to original content produced in Moscow, the show also features Russian-dubbed clips of Sesame Street, Elmo's World, Global Grover and Play with Me Sesame.

Second season 
The second season on "optimism" was filmed in 1999 and broadcast on NTV and STS.

Third season 
The main theme of the third season was "Diversity in the world". The program was broadcast on television channel STS. Several celebrities were guests on the show, including actors Leo Durov and Mary Aronov, composer Grigory Gladkov, and opera singer Vyacheslav Voynorovsky.

Fourth season 
In 2006, the show celebrated its tenth anniversary. Filming of the new fourth season took place in the spring of 2006 in the pavilion "Mosfilm". The premiere of the new season was broadcast on STS channel in September 2006. 

The city yard set was re-vamped to reflect a more realistic depiction of modern-day urban Russia. An intact oak tree grows in the center of this courtyard, and windows from surrounding houses face each other so neighbors can pop their heads out to greet one another. The set includes a creative art center and a playground with an urban backdrop of buildings that was made grittier, a bit grey, with Khrushchev-style buildings in the background. Businka and Kubik's rooms change into a two-story house with a balcony. 

New cast members include Yamila and Altin, two sisters recently arrived in Russia from Kazakhstan.

The show tackled the issue of adoption by introducing a young boy named Kolya who was adopted by Aunt Dinara and her husband, Uncle Jura. 

Season 4 introduced a new recurring segment inspired by Prairie Dawn's art show from Play with Me Sesame where Businka shows artwork done by kids.

Celebrity guests for the season included TV presenter Tina Kandelaki, actress Olga Prokofiev ("My Fair Nanny") and Ekaterina Guseva, Vladimir Turchinsky (Dynamo Moscow), Natasha Podolsk, Varvara, Vladimir Asimov, and children's group "Fidget".

Characters
Human characters include Aunt Dasha and Katya, who was fond of classical music. 

Muppet characters included:
 Zeliboba (Зелибоба), a nine-foot furry blue Dvorovoi (tree spirit) who enjoys dancing and can smell music.
 Businka (Бусинка), "bead", is a bright pink monster who finds joy in everything.
 Kubik (Кубик), "cube", is an orange monster who is the resident pensive problem-solver.

Episodes 
52 half-hour episodes were broadcast over the show's first two years on air.

The program has 156 half-hour episodes in total.

Legacy 
In 2022 former producer released a non-fiction book, Muppets in Moscow, detailing the show's production.

References

Channel One Russia original programming
STS (TV channel) original programming
NTV (Russia) original programming
Russian children's television series
Sesame Street international co-productions
Russian television shows featuring puppetry
Russian television series based on American television series
1996 Russian television series debuts
2007 Russian television series endings
1990s Russian television series
2000s Russian television series

ru:Улица Сезам